Noche de Cuatro Lunas  is a 2000 album by Julio Iglesias.

Track listing
"Gozar la Vida" (3:44)
"Día a Día" (4:35)
"Me Siento de Aquí" (4:29)
"Te Voy a Contar Mi Vida" (4:54)
"No Es Amor Ni Es Amar (Gone Too Far)" (4:29)
"Corazón Partío" (4:48)
"Seremos Libres" (5:05)
"Dos Corazones, Dos Historias (Dos Corações e Uma Historia)" (with Alejandro Fernández) (3:55)
"Mal Acostumbrado (Mal Acostumada)" (4:53)
"Vida (4:08)
"Mamacita (Paparico)" (3:35)
"La Empalizada" (3:35)
"Noche de Cuatro Lunas (American Lady)" (4:04)

Brazilian version
The track "Gozar la Vida" in the Brazilian version, the original is replaced by a sung version in Portuguese called "Viver a Vida" with the participation of Daniel, a greatest Julio's fan.

Certifications

References

2000 albums
Julio Iglesias albums
Spanish-language albums
Albums produced by Draco Rosa